Mode is an unincorporated community in Holland Township, Shelby County, Illinois, United States. Mode is also the home of the Holland Township Building at RR 1 Box 171A, Mode, Illinois 62444.

References

Unincorporated communities in Shelby County, Illinois
Unincorporated communities in Illinois